Barbarians at the Gate: The Fall of RJR Nabisco is a 1989 book about the leveraged buyout (LBO) of RJR Nabisco, written by investigative journalists Bryan Burrough and John Helyar. The book is based upon a series of articles written by the authors for The Wall Street Journal. The book was made into a 1993 made-for-TV movie by HBO, also called Barbarians at the Gate. The book centers on F. Ross Johnson, the CEO of RJR Nabisco, who planned to buy out the rest of the Nabisco shareholders.

Summary
Those opposed to Johnson's bid for the company, Henry Kravis and his cousin George R. Roberts, were among the pioneers of the leveraged buyout (LBO). Kravis was the first person Johnson had talked to about doing the LBO and felt betrayed after learning that Johnson wanted to do the deal with another firm, American Express's former Shearson Lehman Hutton division. Ted Forstmann and his Forstmann Little buyout firm also played a prominent role.

After Kravis and Johnson are unable to reconcile their differences, a bidding war took place which Johnson would eventually lose. The unfortunate side effect of the augmented buyout price to the shareholders was the creation of a worrying level of debt for the company.

The title of the book comes from a statement by Forstmann, in which he called Kravis' money "phoney junk bond crap" and declares him and his cousin as "real people with real money," also stating that to stop raiders like Kravis: "We need to push the barbarians back from the city gates."

Important personalities
F. Ross Johnson, president and CEO, RJR Nabisco
Ed Horrigan, president and chief executive officer of R.J. Reynolds Tobacco division of RJR Nabisco
Edward J. Robinson, chief financial officer of RJR Nabisco
Peter Cohen, chairman and chief executive, Shearson Lehman Hutton
Ted Forstmann, senior partner, Forstmann Little & Company
John Greeniaus, president and chief executive officer of Nabisco division of RJR Nabisco
Eugene Yetman, chairman of the board, RJR Nabisco
Henry Kravis, senior partner, Kohlberg Kravis Roberts & Co.
George R. Roberts, senior partner, Kohlberg Kravis Roberts & Co.
Jim Robinson, chairman and chief executive, American Express
Ted Ammon, financier and investment banker
 Charles Hugel, special committee director

Film adaptation
The book was adapted by Larry Gelbart for a 1993 television movie of the same name directed by Glenn Jordan.

Publishing information and reception
In 2008, HarperCollins re-released Barbarians to mark the two-decade anniversary of the RJR deal. Media columnist Jon Friedman at MarketWatch opined on the occasion that it was "the best business book ever." Friedman spoke with the authors about the two-decade history of the book and of their ensuing careers (the two undertook no further joint projects). Business reporter Andrew Ross Sorkin of The New York Times wrote in his book Too Big to Fail that this is his favourite business book of all time.

References

Hamilton, David P., Book Review, Washington Monthly, January 1990

1990 non-fiction books
Books about companies
Mergers and acquisitions
Kohlberg Kravis Roberts
Business books
Finance books
R. J. Reynolds Tobacco Company
Drexel Burnham Lambert
Harper & Row books
Non-fiction books adapted into films